Chantal Petitclerc  (born December 15, 1969) is a Canadian wheelchair racer and a Senator from Quebec.

Early life
At the age of 13, Petitclerc lost the use of both legs in an accident when at a friend's farm, a heavy barn door fell on her, fracturing her spine at the L1-T12 vertebra. Gaston Jacques, a high school physical education teacher, was to have a decisive influence on her life when he taught her to swim for four lunch hours a week throughout high school as she was unable to participate in the gym course. In a 2011 interview, she stated that, "[swimming] really helped me get more fit and stronger, and helped me live a more independent life in a wheelchair." Swimming also allowed her to discover her competitive drive. While she had previously been first in her class academically, it was her introduction to the world of competitive racing.

Sport
When she was eighteen, Pierre Pomerleau, a trainer at Université Laval in Quebec City, introduced her to wheelchair sports. Using a homemade wheelchair, she took part in her first race and came last, well behind the other competitors. However, she had fallen in love with wheelchair racing and a long and fruitful career had begun.

While Petitclerc was developing her skills as a wheelchair athlete, she pursued her studies, first in social sciences at the CEGEP de Sainte-Foy and then in history at the University of Alberta in Edmonton, where she registered in order to be able to train with Peter Eriksson, who remains her coach to this day.

Petitclerc competed in the Paralympic Games for the first time in Barcelona in 1992, returning with two bronze medals, the start of collection that now includes twenty one Paralympic medals, fourteen of them gold. Four years later, at the Atlanta games, she took gold medals in the 100 and 200 m events and three silvers in the 400, 800, and 1500 m races. At the 2000 Summer Paralympics, she won two golds, in the 200 m and 800 m, and two silvers, in the 100 m and 400 m races. She won three gold medals (in 100 m, 200 m, and 400 m) and a bronze (800 m) at the 2002 World Championships and a gold at the 2002 Commonwealth Games in the 800 m. At the 2004 Summer Olympics (where wheelchair racing was an exhibition sport) she won the 800 m, and went on to an impressive showing with 5 gold medals at the 2004 Summer Paralympics. When she returned from Athens in 2004, Petitclerc told reporters the 2008 Summer Paralympics in Beijing would be her last big international meeting but that she will continue training and road racing for a while. For her performance in 2008, she was awarded the Lou Marsh Trophy as Canadian athlete of the year and the Canadian Press's Bobbie Rosenfeld Award as Canada's female athlete of the year. Petitclerc was also awarded the Best Female award at the Paralympic Sport Awards.

With her 5 golds in the 2004 Paralympics, she tied the existing Canadian gold medal record at a single Games, Winter or Summer, set by Stephanie Dixon at the 2000 Summer Paralympics. Her 5 golds in the 2008 Paralympics tied that record. As of 2010, the record still stood. As of 2012 she holds five world records for wheelchair racing.  she is still the most gold-medalled female paralympic athlete with 14 golds and 21 medals.

She was chosen as the flagbearer of the Canadian team at the opening ceremonies of the 2006 Commonwealth Games.

Petitclerc lives in Montreal, and trains at Complexe sportif Claude-Robillard.

Rio Tinto Alcan is her main sponsor since 1998.

Petitclerc was appointed as a coach and mentor to the British athletics team ahead of the 2012 Summer Paralympics, working alongside her former coach and UK Athletics' Paralympic head coach Peter Eriksson.

Petitclerc was named the Chef de Mission for Canada's 2014 Commonwealth Games team. She was also named Chef de Mission for the 2016 Paralympic Games in Rio de Janeiro.

Personal life
Petitclerc is married to electro-acoustic music composer James Duhamel and gave birth to son Elliot in December 2013.

Senate
On March 18, 2016, Petitclerc was named to the Senate of Canada on the advice of Prime Minister Justin Trudeau. She sits as a member of the Independent Senators Group. Her main priorities in the Senate are health as well as the rights of persons with disabilities. In June 2016, Senator Petitclerc delivered her first speech in the Chamber on Bill C-14, An Act to amend the Criminal Code and to make related amendments to other Acts (medical assistance in dying). Her speech moved many of her colleagues, when she quoted: "When you have a disability, the worst part is feeling as if you have no control over your own life, over your own body. It happens to all people with disabilities, I can assure you." She also sponsored Bill S-5, An Act to amend the Tobacco Act and the Non Smokers' Health Act and to make consequential amendments to other acts.

Honours and awards
The St-Marc-des-Carrières municipal ice hockey arena now bears her name.

In 2002, Petitclerc was awarded with the Meritorious Service Medal (civil division).

In 2005, Petitclerc was invested as a Knight of the Order of Quebec That year, Petitclerc became part of the Canadian Disability Hall of Fame.

On June 16, 2009, it was announced that Petitclerc would receive a star on Canada's Walk of Fame in Toronto. The induction ceremony was held on September 12, 2009.

In 2009, she was invested as a Companion of the Order of Canada "for her achievements as a Paralympic champion known internationally as an inspiration, and for her commitment to developing sports for athletes with a disability".

In 2010, she was inducted into Canada's Sports Hall of Fame in Calgary, Alberta.

In 2012, she was awarded an Honorary Doctor of Laws degree by the University of Alberta.

Petitclerc has also received both the Queen's Golden Jubilee Medal  and the Queen's Diamond Jubilee Medal.

In 2015, Petitclerc was inducted into the Canadian Paralympic Hall of Fame of the Canadian Paralympic Committee.

See also
Athletes with most gold medals in one event at the Paralympic Games

References

External links
 Chantal Petitclerc profile on Bell Champions
 
 

Living people
1969 births
People with paraplegia
Canadian female wheelchair racers
Olympic wheelchair racers of Canada
Athletes (track and field) at the 2006 Commonwealth Games
Athletes (track and field) at the 1992 Summer Paralympics
Athletes (track and field) at the 1996 Summer Paralympics
Athletes (track and field) at the 2000 Summer Paralympics
Athletes (track and field) at the 2004 Summer Paralympics
Athletes (track and field) at the 2008 Summer Paralympics
Companions of the Order of Canada
Commonwealth Games gold medallists for Canada
French Quebecers
Laureus World Sports Awards winners
Lou Marsh Trophy winners
Paralympic track and field athletes of Canada
Paralympic bronze medalists for Canada
Paralympic gold medalists for Canada
Paralympic silver medalists for Canada
Sportspeople from Quebec
Wheelchair racers at the 2004 Summer Olympics
University of Alberta alumni
World record holders in Paralympic athletics
Wheelchair racers at the 1996 Summer Olympics
Wheelchair racers at the 2000 Summer Olympics
Paralympic wheelchair racers
Medalists at the 1992 Summer Paralympics
Medalists at the 1996 Summer Paralympics
Medalists at the 2000 Summer Paralympics
Medalists at the 2004 Summer Paralympics
Medalists at the 2008 Summer Paralympics
Canadian senators from Quebec
Independent Canadian senators
Women members of the Senate of Canada
Canadian people of Vietnamese descent
Canadian female track and field athletes
Commonwealth Games medallists in athletics
21st-century Canadian politicians
21st-century Canadian women politicians
Independent Senators Group
Politicians with paraplegia
Olympic female wheelchair racers
Paralympic Sport Awards — Best Female winners
Paralympic medalists in athletics (track and field)
Canadian Disability Hall of Fame
Medallists at the 2006 Commonwealth Games